This is a list of Polish television related events from 2013.

Events
18 May - Natalia Sikora wins the second series of The Voice of Poland.
26 May - Klaudia Gawor wins the third series of X Factor, becoming the show's first woman to have won.
30 November - 28-year-old sand artist Tetiana Galitsyna wins the sixth series of Mam talent!. Mateusz Ziółko wins the third series of The Voice of Poland on the same evening.

Debuts

Television shows

1990s
Klan (1997–present)

2000s
M jak miłość (2000–present)
Na Wspólnej (2003–present)
Pierwsza miłość (2004–present)
Dzień Dobry TVN (2005–present)
Mam talent! (2008–present)

2010s
The Voice of Poland (2011–present)
X Factor (2011–present)

Ending this year

Births

Deaths

See also
2013 in Poland